The Schneider-Schott Music Prize is a cash award bestowed to an outstanding composer, performing artist, or music ensemble in classical music—with emphasis, but not mandatory, on contemporary music. From 1986 to 2006, the prize was awarded annually, and thereafter, biennially. The prize is alternately given to a composer and an interpreter. The award ceremony is traditionally associated with a concert by the award winner.

Winners 

 1986: Detlev Müller-Siemens and Wolfgang von Schweinitz
 1987: Ensemble Modern
 1988: Hans-Jürgen von Bose
 1989:  and Walter Zimmermann
 1990: Adriana Hölszky
 1991: Gruppe Neue Musik Hanns Eisler
 1992: Ulrich Stranz
 1993: Steffen Schleiermacher and 
 1994:  and Hanspeter Kyburz
 1995: ensemble recherche
 1996: Isabel Mundry and Moritz Eggert
 1997: 
 1998: Helmut Oehring
 1999: 
 2000:  and Mike Svoboda
 2001: Babette Koblenz
 2002: Jörg Widmann
 2003: Salome Kammer and 
 2004: 
 2005: Enno Poppe
 2006: 
 2008: Márton Illés
 2010: Anna Prohaska
 2012: Birke J. Bertelsmeier
 2014: Carolin Widmann
 2016: Gordon Kampe
 2018: 
 2020: Benjamin Scheuer

Candidate criteria and selection 
Candidates should meet criteria of financial need. The winner is selected by an independent five-person jury of music experts.

Jury 2016 and 2018 
Source:
 Wolfgang Rathert (Head of Jury, Ludwig Maximilian University of Munich)
 Achim Heidenreich (ZKM Center for Art and Media Karlsruhe)
 Wolfgang Rihm (Composer, Karlsruhe)
 Yvonne Stern-Campo (Schott Music Mainz)
 Lars Vogt (Pianist, Berlin)

Prize founder and benefactor 
The €15,000 award is funded by an endowment established by Heinz Schneider-Schott (1906–1988) and his wife. In 1952, Schneider-Schott, a son-in-law of Ludwig Strecker, became a director of the London-based music publishing firm, Schott and Co., which in 1980, reunited with Schott Music GmbH & Co. KG, in Mainz, which in 2006 was renamed Schott Music Limited.

References

External links
 

German music awards
Classical music awards
Awards established in 1986